Slissenko or Slisenko is a Ukrainian-language surname. Notable people with the surname include::

Anatol Slissenko, Soviet, Russian and French mathematician and computer scientist
Vasyl Slisenko, Ukrainian physicist, director of the Institute for Nuclear Research of NASU

Ukrainian-language surnames